Mirel Çota (born 14 May 1988) is an Albanian professional footballer who plays as a striker for Albanian club AF Elbasani.

Club career

Tirana
24-year old Çota completed a transfer at Tirana on 12 June 2012 by penning a two-year contract worth €50,000. He made his league debut on 25 August in the opening day of 2012–13 Albanian Superliga versus Tomori Berat, winning a penalty in 30th minute which was scored by Klodian Duro as Tirana won 0–1 at Tomori Stadium. He was replaced in the 68th minute following a collision with the defender Charles Ofoyen which injured his eyebrow which required 8 stitches. He opened his scoring account on 2 September in the second matchday against Shkumbini Peqin, scoring a tap-in after dribbling goalkeeper Elvis Kotorri in an eventual 3–0 home win.

Elbasan
At end of July 2014, Çota joined newly promoted club Elbasani for an undisclosed fee. Then he went in Struga where his team was doing the pre-season training. He debuted with club in the opening week one 2014–15 Albanian Superliga season on 23 August in a 1–0 loss against the champions of Skënderbeu Korçë. Çota scored his first maiden Elbasani in a 1–5 defeat to his former side Teuta Durrës on 11 September.

On 5 October 2014, he scored the second goal of the season, the opener of a 2–0 win against the fellow relegation strugglers Apolonia Fier for the first three points of the campaign. Later in November, Çota netted the third of the season in a 2–0 away win against Teuta Durrës to lead the team to the second win of the season. He finished the first part of the season by being the team's top goalscorer with 3 goals and left the club during the winter transfer market.

Teuta Durrës
On 6 January 2015, Çota joined fellow top flight side Teuta Durrës by signing a contract until the end of the season, returning for a third time, also becoming the club's third winter signing. He made his first appearance in the friendly against Tirana for days later, netting in a 2–2 draw. His competitive debut occurred on 25 January in the match against Flamurtari Vlorë, finished in a 2–1 away defeat with Çota scoring his team's only goal (later credited to Vukašin Tomić as an owngoal). The match was dubbed as a "scandal" by Albania media and fixed by AFA. Çota appeared in 17 league games during the second part of the season, scoring twice as Teuta barely avoided relegation.

Sopoti Librazhd
Çota joined Albanian First Division side Sopoti Librazhd on 1 August 2015 on a free transfer, as the transfer was announced by the club administrator Iridion Bahiti. He was given the shirt with number 9 by the club and become the vice-captain.

He made his debut in team's opening match of the season on 12 September 2015, starting and playing full-90 minutes in a goalless home draw against Shkumbini Peqin. Çota opened his scoring account two weeks later by scoring in the 3–0 win against Butrinti Sarandë, helping the team to get its first win of the season in week three. On 17 October, he scored in a 3–1 win over Turbina Cërrik, which was followed by another two goals during the 2–0 win against Apolonia Fier, taking his tally up to four goals.

On 10 April 2016, Çota scored a brace in the 3–2 away defeat to Lushnja in the matchday 21, reaching double-figures for the first time in his career. He eventually finished the 2015–16 season by scoring 13 times in 23 league appearances, setting a new personal best, as Sopoti barely escaped relegation by finishing 8th in Group B.

He declined during 2016–17 season, scoring only 5 goals in 23 appearances as Sopoti was relegated in Albanian Second Division.

Dinamo Tirana
On 27 August 2017, Çota completed a transfer to fellow capital team Dinamo Tirana, taking the squad number 9 for the 2017–18 season. He made his Dinamo debut on 17 September in the opening matchday against Besa Kavajë which finished in a 2–0 away loss. His first score-sheet contributions came in his second ever appearance for the club five days later, netting the lone goal against Erzeni Shijak.

Çota left the club in mid-January 2018. He scored only twice in 12 league appearances during his short spell at Blue Submarine.

Turbina Cërrik
On 17 January 2018, Turbina Cërrik announced they have signed Çota for an undisclosed fee. The 29-year old signed a contract running until the end of 2017–18 season. He enjoyed a fine form during his spell at the club, scoring six times in 12 appearances, including a brace in the 3–1 home win versus Shënkolli.

Sopoti Librazhd return
On 30 July 2018, it was announced that Çota has returned to his boyhood club Sopoti Librazhd to help them to bouche back to Albanian First Division. He scored a brace in the opening week of championship, a 2–1 home win over Tirana B. His second brace came two weeks later in a 5–3 hammering of Partizani Tirana B. On 4 November, Çota scored a hat-trick in a 14–1 unprecedent win of Sopoti versus Kevitan. He doubled his tally for the season with another brace, this time against Ada Velipojë on 25 November, in another spectacular win (8–2).

AF Elbasani
On 21 August 2021, Çota signed with newly formed team AF Elbasani.

International career
A former Albania youth international, Çota has represented under-17 and -19. With 4 goals in 3 matches, he is Albania under-17 all-time top scorer.

Career statistics

Honours

Club
Tirana
Albanian Supercup: 2012

AF Elbasani
Albanian Third Division: 2021–22

References

External links

1988 births
Living people
People from Librazhd
Association football forwards
Albanian footballers
Albania youth international footballers
KF Teuta Durrës players
Savona F.B.C. players
KF Tirana players
KF Elbasani players
KS Sopoti Librazhd players
FK Dinamo Tirana players
KS Turbina Cërrik players
Kategoria Superiore players
Serie C players
Kategoria e Parë players
Kategoria e Dytë players
Albanian expatriate footballers
Expatriate footballers in Italy
Albanian expatriate sportspeople in Italy